Agrupación Cultural y Deportiva San Marcial is a Spanish football team based in Lardero in the autonomous community of La Rioja. Founded in 1975, it plays in Tercera División.

Season to season

14 seasons in Tercera División

External links
Official website 
Futbolme team profile  

Football clubs in La Rioja (Spain)
Association football clubs established in 1975
1975 establishments in Spain